Nikortsminda Cathedral is a Georgian Orthodox Church, located in Nikortsminda, Racha region of Georgia.

Nikortsminda was built in 1010–1014 during the reign of Bagrat III of Georgia and was repaired in 1534 by the King Bagrat III of Imereti. Three-storied bell-tower next to the cathedral was built in the second half of the 19th century. Frescoes inside the cathedral date from the 17th century.

The cathedral is on the Tentative List for status as a UNESCO World Heritage Site.

Details 
Stylistically, Nikortsminda reflects the Georgian cross-dome style of architecture, following a six-conch-within-rectangle plan. The rectangular western apse has adjoining side chapels.

Dome 
Nikortsminda has a massive dome and unbroken arcatures as its twelve windows, which are decorated with ornamented architraves.

Interior 
The cathedral is formed of five interior apses, from which rise the massive dome, resting upon half-pillar shaped apse projections. It is abundantly lit by the twelve windows of the drum. The transition from the hexahedron of the round drum to the dome circle is effected by means of spheric pendentives. The altar apse bema and the western passage enlarge the interior space. The interior is decorated with frescoes from the 17th century and ornamental sculptural reliefs, reflecting the mastery of the late-Medieval Georgian ecclesiastical art.

Exterior 
The cathedral follows a short-armed rectangular cross plan and has a short segment to the west. The facades of the cathedral are covered with smoothly hewn stone. Decorations include unbroken arcatures and various rich ornaments, including multiple-figured narrative reliefs and episodes (The Transfiguration, The Judgment Day, The Ascension of the Cross, figures of Saint George and Saint Theodore, real and mythic animals, forming one premeditated program). Nikortsminda has among the most beautiful decorations of all Georgian churches and cathedrals as several different styles can be seen.

Gallery

Notes

References 
 The Spiritual Treasure of Georgia. Khelovneba Publishers, Tbilisi: 2005.

External links 

 Nikortsminda retrieved from Parliament.Ge 
 further photos: ; 

Church buildings with domes
Georgian Orthodox cathedrals in Georgia (country)
11th-century Eastern Orthodox church buildings
Eastern Orthodox church buildings in Georgia (country)
Racha
World Heritage Tentative List
Buildings and structures in Racha-Lechkhumi and Kvemo Svaneti
Tourist attractions in Racha-Lechkhumi and Kvemo Svaneti
11th-century churches in Georgia (country)